The 2010 Villanova Wildcats football team represented Villanova University in the 2010 NCAA Division I FCS football season. The Wildcats were led by 26th year head coach Andy Talley and played their home games at Villanova Stadium in Villanova, Pennsylvania. They were a member of the Colonial Athletic Association. They finished the season 9–5, 5–3 in CAA play.

Schedule

References

Villanova
Villanova Wildcats football seasons
Villanova
Villanova Wildcats football